The Stylistics is the debut album by American R&B group the Stylistics, released in November 1971 on the Avco record label. It was produced by Thom Bell and recorded at Sigma Sound Studios in Philadelphia.  The album has been called "a sweet soul landmark."

Group members Airrion Love, Herb Murrell, James Dunn, and James Smith can be heard on "You're a Big Girl Now," recorded and released as a single prior to the beginning of production on the album, but according to lead singer Russell Thompkins Jr., they're absent from the album's other eight songs aside from Love's harmony vocals on "You Are Everything." In John A. Jackson's book A House on Fire: The Rise and Fall of Philadelphia Soul (2004), Sigma Sound Studios founder and engineer Joe Tarsia says, "I don't care if it was the Stylistics or Harold Melvin and the Blue Notes, or whoever. All the backgrounds on all those songs were sung not by the groups, but by either Kenny Gamble, Leon Huff, Thom Bell, Carl Helm [or] Bunny Sigler," while Sigler says that "most" of the male background vocals on the Stylistics' hit songs were provided by himself, Gamble, Bell and Helm.

History
The Stylistics reached #23 on the Billboard 200 and #3 on Billboard's R&B albums chart. It features the hit singles "Betcha by Golly, Wow," "You Are Everything," "People Make the World Go Round," "Stop, Look, Listen (to Your Heart)," and "You're a Big Girl Now." All five singles reached the top ten on the R&B chart, beginning a stretch of 12 top-ten hits in a row. "Betcha by Golly, Wow" and "You Are Everything" also reached the top ten on the Billboard Hot 100.

Track listing

Personnel
Russell Thompkins Jr. – lead and backing vocals
Linda Creed, Barbara Ingram – additional background vocals
Norman Harris, Roland Chambers – guitar
Ronnie Baker – bass
Earl Young – drums
Larry Washington – congas
Vince Montana – percussion
Lenny Pakula – piano, organ
Joe DeAngelis, Stephanie Fauber, Robert Martin – French horn
Rocco Bene, Bobby Hartzell – trumpet
Jack Faith – alto saxophone, flute
George Shaw – flute
Vincent Forchetti, Bob Moore, Richard Genevese – trombone
Don Renaldo, Tony Sinagoga, Albert Berone, Rudy Malizia, Angelo Pretrella, Romeo Di Stefano, Charles Apollonia, Davis Barnett, Richard Jones, Herschel Wise – strings
Mary Gale – harp
Fredric Cohen – oboe

Charts

Singles

References

External links
 

1971 debut albums
The Stylistics albums
Albums produced by Thom Bell
Albums arranged by Thom Bell
Albums recorded at Sigma Sound Studios
Avco Records albums